Royal Naval Air Station Hinstock (HMS Godwit) or more simply RNAS Hinstock is a former Royal Navy, Fleet Air Arm station, located near the village of Hinstock in Shropshire, England.

The airfield opened as RAF Ollerton in 1941. It was utilised by RAF Maintenance Units and also used as a satellite landing ground (SLG) for RAF Burtonwood and RAF Shawbury. It was then transferred to the Fleet Air Arm who used it from 1942 until 1947, home to a small number of Naval Air Squadrons, specialising in instrument and blind approach flying training and operating a variety of aircraft. The airfield was closed on 28 February 1947.

History

Royal Air Force (1941 - 1942) 

The airfield was used by the Royal Air Force during the early years of World War Two. Initially it was opened to No. 37 MU from RAF Burtonwood, as No. 21 Satellite Landing Ground (SLG) called RAF Ollerton. This followed by No. 27 MU from RAF Shawbury and at some point No. 29 MU from RAF High Ercall. During this initial phase it was a grass airfield.

The following Royal Air Force Maintenance units were stationed here:
 No. 27 Maintenance Unit RAF
 No. 29 Maintenance Unit RAF
 No. 37 Maintenance Unit RAF

Royal Navy Fleet Air Arm (1942 - 1947) 
Ollerton was transferred from the Royal Air Force to the Fleet Air Arm (FAA) on 13 August 1942 and became known as Royal Navy Air Station (RNAS) Hinstock or HMS Godwit. Upon the admiralty taking control, it was used initially as a satellite airfield for RNAS Stretton (HMS Blackcap). Hinstock was used as a training station for the FAA Central Naval Instrument Flying Training School. In connection with the training school it had temporary use of two satellite airfields: RNAS Weston Park and RAF Station Bratton. In July 1943 the runway was rebuilt using heavy steel track. The first FAA squadron, 758 Naval Air Squadron, moved to RNAS Hinstock, on the 15 August 1942. It was initially known as the Beam Approach School, then later known as the Blind Approach School. In 1943 it was titled Naval Advanced Instrument Flying School and as well as Oxford aircraft, the squadron also operated Anson, Reliant, Tiger Moth, and Wellington aircraft. Later in the year Harvard aircraft replaced the Wellingtons and by 1944, 758 NAS had over 100 aircraft. The relief landing grounds, at RNAS Weston Park (HMS Godwit II) and RAF Station Bratton, were used by 758 NAS for Instrument Flying Training, until Hinstock gained Peplow as a satellite airfield, from 28 February 1945 and the squadron then operated from RNAS Peplow (HMS Godwit II). On the 18 March 1946 the squadron absorbed part of 798 Naval Air Squadron, however, 758 NAS disbanded on the 14 May 1946, at Peplow, becoming 'B' Flight of 780 Naval Air Squadron.

729 Naval Air Squadron formed on 1 January 1945 at RNAS Hinstock as an Instrument Flying Training squadron and as an offshoot of 758 NAS, the Royal Naval Advanced Instrument Flying Training Unit, for service in the Far East. It made use of 758 NAS's North American Harvard and Airspeed Oxford aircraft, enabling working up while based on the U.K. The squadron personnel took passage for India on 16 April 1945, without aircraft. On the 1 June 1945 702 Naval Air Squadron reformed as an offshoot of 758 NAS, equipped with Oxford and Harvard aircraft, as an Instrument Flying Training & Checking Squadron. Seven weeks later the squadron personnel took passage to RNAS Schofields in Australia.

734 Naval Air Squadron, an Engine Handling Unit, which used modified, ex-Royal Air Force Whitley Mk VII aircraft to train aircrew, moved from RNAS Worthy Down to RNAS Hinstock, on the 21 August 1945, however, it operated out of Hinstock's satellite airfield, RNAS Peplow (HMS Godwit), also located in Shropshire, which was a former Royal Air Force bomber base, with long runways, that could easily accommodate the Whitley. The squadron disbanded on 21 February 1946. 

798 Naval Air Squadron was an Advanced Single Engine Conversion & Refresher Flying Training Unit which moved to Hinstock from RNAS Halesworth on the 28 November 1945, equipped with Barracuda, Firefly, Harvard, Seafire and Tiger Moth aircraft. The squadron disbanded at Hinstock on the 18 March 1946.

The following FAA units were here at some point:

780 Naval Air Squadron

See also

 List of Royal Air Force Satellite Landing Grounds

References

Royal Naval Air Stations
Buildings and structures in Shropshire
Military installations closed in 1947